Örebro IK was an ice hockey team from Örebro, Sweden that was founded in 1972.  The team filed for bankruptcy and was liquidated in 1999, after many years of playing elite-level hockey. Today, Örebro is represented in Sweden's upper-tier hockey leagues by Örebro HK.

External links
Club profile on Eliteprospects.com

References

Sport in Örebro
Defunct ice hockey teams in Sweden
1972 establishments in Sweden
Ice hockey clubs established in 1972
1999 disestablishments in Sweden
Sports clubs disestablished in 1999